The Willard Gallery was a contemporary art gallery operating in New York City from 1940 until 1987. It was founded by Marian Willard Johnson.

History 

In 1936, Marian Guthrie Willard had founded the East River Gallery as an art rental gallery at 358 East 57 St. As Willard became "more and more interested in the development of individual artists" the idea of renting became less and less appealing and she officially closed the East River Gallery in 1938 to re-evaluate her direction. Willard spent 1938–1940 in association with J.B. Neumann who was turning to selling old masters to supplement the sale of contemporary art. In 1940, she found a small space next door to Curt Valentin's Bucholtz Gallery at 32 East 57th St. where she opened Willard Gallery.

Marian Willard Johnson wrote of her experience running the gallery:

In 1942, Willard married Dan Johnson and changed her surname to Willard Johnson, henceforth directing the gallery in partnership with her husband. In 1962 the gallery moved to its final location at 29 East 72 St. After Dan and Marian Johnson retired in 1970 their daughter, Miani Johnson, took directorship of the gallery until, again facing relocation, she closed it in 1987. Willard Gallery was a member of the Art Dealer’s Association of America.

Exhibition history by artist last name

Group/theme shows 
French-Canadian Primitives: November 30 – December 24, 1937

Art and Commerce: 1942

American Sculpture of Our Time: January 5 – 23, 1943

7 Years: Retrospective Exhibition: December 6 – 13, 1943

Atelier 17:  May 15 – June 2, 1945

American Folk Art: September 28 – October 17, 1953; November 29 – December 31, 1955; October 15 – November 9, 1957; October 6 – 31, 1959; November 1 – 25, 1961

Japanese Screens: December 1, 1954 – January 8, 1955; October 30 – November 24, 1956; December 1 – 31, 1960

A Group of Exceptional Drawings: January 3 – 28, 1956

Salute to Modern Art, U.S.A: 1956

Sculpture, Various Times and Cultures: January 3 – 26, 1957

Indian Miniatures: 1957

Heroic Encounter: February 4 – March 1, 1958

CORE Auction: 1961

American Folk Art Stony Point Folk Art Gallery January 14 – February 15, 1964 January 7 – 31, 1965

Decoys: December 1 – 21, 1971

Introductions 1936–1948: January 3 – 27, 1962

Dynamics of Black and White: April 3 – 28, 1962

Opening show at 29 E 72: December 1963

Black, White, and Color: January 4 – 29, 1966 

Willard Gallery 30th Anniversary: December 13 – January 7, 1967

Prints from Czechoslovakia: November 17 – December 19, 1970

Art for Peace: September 19 – 26, 1970

Intimate Selections of the American Spirit: March 16 – April 17, 1971

Dimensions: March 21 – April 15, 1972

Spring: April 25 – May 27, 1972

William Pettet, Fred Wardy, Randy Hardy, James Reineking: May 15 – June 16, 1973

Contemporary Drawings: December 4 – 29, 1973

New Talent Festival: June 4 – 15, 1974

Selections: February 7 – March 4, 1976

Abstract Images: January 4 – February 3, 1977

Jeffrey Lew, Joan Thorne, Robert Lobe, Michel Tetherow: May 19 – June 21, 1979

Whiter Black Drawings: December 1 – 23, 1982

Selected Drawings by Eleven Artists: September 14 – October 6, 1984

Willard Gallery 50th Anniversary 

Part 1: April 10 – May 10, 1986

Part 2: May 15 – June 27, 1986

Drawings: December 6 – 24, 1986

Prints: February 5 – March 7, 1987

References 

Defunct art museums and galleries in New York City